In the inaugural year, the Bonnaroo Music Festival was held June 21–23.  The more than 70,000 tickets sold out in advance.

Lineup

June 21st
(artists listed from earliest to latest set times)

What Stage:
Dirty Dozen Brass Band 
DJ Logic
Les Claypool's Flying Frog Brigade
Amon Tobin
Widespread Panic
Which Stage:
Old Crow Medicine Show
Soulive
Ween
Gov't Mule
This Tent:
Jim White
Umphrey's McGee
Gran Torino
Keller Williams Incident
That Tent:
The Big Wu
Donna the Buffalo
Acoustic Syndicate 
Karl Denson's Tiny Universe
Cinema Tent:
U2: Rattle and Hum
The Grateful Dead Movie
The Harder They Come
The Earth Will Swallow You
Bittersweet Motel
Inside Out
Dont Look Back
Stop Making Sense

June 22nd
(artists listed from earliest to latest set times)

What Stage:
Blackalicious 
Ben Harper
Cut Chemist
The String Cheese Incident
Widespread Panic
Which Stage:
John Butler Trio
Jack Johnson
Jurassic 5
This Tent:
The Del McCoury Band
Drums & Tuba
Lil' Rascals Brass Band
The Disco Biscuits
Galactic
That Tent:
Llama
Col. Bruce Hampton and The Codetalkers
Particle 
Colonel Claypool's Bucket of Bernie Brains
moe.
Cinema Tent:
Bob Marley: Time Will Tell
Buena Vista Social Club
The Last Waltz
Pleasure and Pain/Ben Harper
Gov't Mule Documentary
This Is Spinal Tap
The Rocky Horror Picture Show
The Wall

June 23rd
(artists listed from earliest to latest set times)

What Stage: 
Vinroc
Ween
Phil Lesh and Friends with Bob Weir
DJ Z-Trip
Trey Anastasio
Which Stage:
Corey Harris
North Mississippi Allstars
Béla Fleck and Edgar Meyer
This Tent:
Mofro
RANA
Gabe Dixon
Norah Jones
That Tent:
Robert Randolph and the Family Band
Campbell Brothers
Dottie Peoples 
Blind Boys of Alabama
Cinema Tent:
The Blues Brothers
Tommy
Evolution
The Cable Guy
CB4
Scratch

Superjam
(Core band members only, guests not included)

Michael Kang (violin and electric mandolin), Bela Fleck 
(electric synth-banjo), Jeff Raines (acoustic guitar), and Robert Randolph
(pedal steel guitar)

References

Bonnaroo Music Festival by year
2002 in American music
2002 music festivals
2002 in Tennessee
Bonnaroo